Caroline Elizabeth Flynn (born February 28, 1994) is an American soccer midfielder.

College career
Flynn started to play for University of Nebraska in the spring semester of 2012, after she chose to forego her senior year at Lincoln Southwest High School. She played 78 matches (starting all of them) and scored 11 goals for the Huskers. Flynn earned several honors and in 2016 she helped the Huskers to reach their first NCAA Tournament since 2013.

Club career

FC Kansas City, 2017
Flynn was selected by Portland Thorns FC with the 40th pick in the 2017 NWSL College Draft making her the fourth Huskers player to be picked in a NWSL Draft. The Thorns failed to sign her to a contract. On April 14, 2017, FC Kansas City announced that Flynn would be added to their roster ahead of the start of the 2017 National Women's Soccer League season.

FC Kansas City ceased operations following the 2017 season, Utah Royals FC inherited all player contracts from FCKC but Flynn did not join them.

International career
On April 25, 2016, Flynn was called for the United States U23 team for a training camp in Charlottesville, Virginia that involved only college players. On May 25, 2016, she was included among the 20-players squad the travelled to England to play the 2016 Nordic Tournament, an important youth competition.

References

External links
 USSF player profile
 FC Kansas City player profile
 Player's Profile at Scorersway
 Nebraska player profile

Living people
1994 births
Nebraska Cornhuskers women's soccer players
FC Kansas City players
Sportspeople from Lincoln, Nebraska
National Women's Soccer League players
Portland Thorns FC draft picks
American women's soccer players
Soccer players from Nebraska
Women's association football midfielders